Upper Capitol is a town in Saint Andrew Parish, Grenada.  It is located towards the northern end of the island. It is adjacent to St. James, and a part of the bigger Birch Grove community

References

Populated places in Grenada
Saint Andrew Parish, Grenada